The Midwest Rock Festival was a music festival held at the State Fair Park in West Allis, Wisconsin, on July 25–27, 1969.

The festival featured Led Zeppelin, Buffy Sainte-Marie, The First Edition, Sweetwater, Pacific Gas & Electric, SRC and Shag (July 25); Blind Faith, Delaney and Bonnie and Friends, Shag, Taste, John Mayall & the Bluesbreakers, MC5 and SRC (July 26); and Johnny Winter, Joe Cocker and the Grease Band, Bob Seger System, Jim Schwall Blues Period, MC5, Zephyr, Shag, Litter and SRC (July 27).

The show had a flatbed trailer as a stage set on the field in front of the racetrack grandstand.

See also 
List of music festivals in the United States
List of historic rock festivals

References
  
 

Concerts in the United States
Hippie movement
1969 in American music
Rock festivals in the United States
Festivals in Milwaukee
1969 in Wisconsin
Music festivals established in 1969
1969 music festivals
Heavy metal festivals in the United States
Wisconsin State Fair